Elizabeth Ann Wolford (born December 17, 1966) is the Chief United States district judge of the United States District Court for the Western District of New York. She is the first female judge to serve in the Western District. She is the first female to be Chief Judge of the Western District of New York.

Biography

Wolford was born in 1966, in Buffalo, New York. She received a Bachelor of Arts degree in 1989, from Colgate University. She received a Juris Doctor in 1992, from the University of Notre Dame Law School. Upon graduation from law school she joined the recently formed The Wolford Law Firm LLP as a partner, spending her entire career in private practice at that firm. Her practice was concentrated in the areas of commercial, employment and personal injury litigation before both federal and state courts. She served as President of the Greater Rochester Association for Women Attorneys from 2003 to 2004 and as President of the Foundation of the Monroe County Bar from 2010 to 2012.

Federal judicial service

On May 16, 2013, President Barack Obama nominated Wolford to serve as a United States District Judge of the United States District Court for the Western District of New York, to the seat vacated by Judge Charles J. Siragusa, who assumed senior status on December 15, 2012. The Senate Judiciary Committee reported her nomination to the full Senate on August 1, 2013 by a voice vote. On December 12, 2013, the U.S. Senate voted 55–41 to invoke cloture on Wolford's nomination, cutting off a Republican-led filibuster. The Senate then confirmed her later that day by a 70–29 vote. She received her judicial commission on December 17, 2013. She became Chief Judge on July 14, 2021.

See also
List of first women lawyers and judges in New York

References

External links

1966 births
Living people
21st-century American judges
21st-century American women judges
American women lawyers
Colgate University alumni
Judges of the United States District Court for the Western District of New York
New York (state) lawyers
Notre Dame Law School alumni
Lawyers from Buffalo, New York
United States district court judges appointed by Barack Obama